Bethel is a city in Bethel Census Area, Alaska, United States.  It is the largest community on the Kuskokwim River, located approximately  upriver from where the river flows into Kuskokwim Bay.  It is also the largest city in western Alaska and in the Unorganized Borough, as well as the eighth-largest in the state. Bethel has a population of 6,325 as of the 2020 census, up from 6,080 in 2010.

Annual events in Bethel include the Kuskokwim 300, a dogsled race; Camai, a Yup'ik dance festival held each spring; and the Bethel Fair held in August.

History
Southwestern Alaska has been the homelands of Yup'ik peoples and their ancestors for thousands of years. The residents of what became  Bethel were called the Mamterillermiut, meaning "Smokehouse People", after their nearby fish smokehouse. In the late 19th century, the Alaska Commercial Company established a trading post in the town, called Mumtrekhlogamute, which had a population of 41 people by the 1880 census.

In 1885, the Moravian Church established a mission in the area under the leadership of Rev. William Weinland and Caroline (born Yost)  and John Henry Kilbuck, Jr., a Lenape, and his wife Edith, a daughter and granddaughter of Moravian missionaries in Kansas. They both learned Yup'ik, which aided them in their missionary work. He made Yup'ik the language of the Moravian Church in the community and region, and helped translate the Christian Bible into the language. The missionaries moved Bethel from Mamterillermiut to its present location on the west side of the Kuskokwim River. A United States post office was opened in 1905.

Alaska Natives in this area have had a long Christian history, in part from Russian Orthodox, Catholic and Moravian influence. As in many Indian villages in Alaska, Christian tradition has become interwoven with the people's original culture.

Development came to the area during and after World War II, causing a great social change among the Alaska Indiginous
.

In 1971, Bethel established a community radio station KYUK, which has been a strong influence in the redevelopment and revival of Yup'ik culture and self-definition in the modern world. It was the first Native-owned and operated radio station in the US. Similar stations were soon started in Kotzebue, and by 1990, there were 10 stations in communities of fewer than 3,500 people.

On February 19, 1997, a school shooting attracted widespread media attention to Bethel when 16-year-old Evan Ramsey, a student at Bethel Regional High School, shot and killed his principal and one student and wounded two others, for which he later received a 210-year prison sentence.

In 2009, Bethel opted out of status as a "Local Option" community, theoretically opening the door to allowing alcohol sales in the city; residents and city officials maintained that all liquor license requests would be actively opposed. In October 2015, though, a vote for allowing alcohol sales in Bethel passed and two liquor licenses were approved for existing stores in the city.

In 2012, Bethel received worldwide coverage after some pranksters distributed flyers falsely announcing the launch of a Taco Bell restaurant, prompting Taco Bell to send a helicopter to the remote town, bearing a Taco Bell truck, which was itself bearing ingredients for 10,000 tacos.

On November 3, 2015, the Kilbuck building housing both the Ayaprun Elitnaurviat Yup'ik immersion school and the Kuskokwim Learning Academy caught fire, destroying the immersion school and damaging the boarding school. Fire fighters demolished part of the building in an effort to save a media center containing Yup'ik artifacts and elder interviews.

Geography
Bethel is located at  (60.792222, −161.755833).

Though the region is flat and generally treeless, Bethel lies inside the Yukon Delta National Wildlife Refuge, the second largest wildlife refuge in the United States.

Climate
Bethel has a subarctic climate (Köppen: "Dfc"), with long, somewhat snowy, and cold winters, and short, mild summers. Warm days of above  can be expected on 14 days per summer. Snowfall usually falls in light bouts, and is actually greater in November and December (before the sea freezes) than in January and February, averaging  a season.

Demographics

The first settlement at the location of Bethel reported on the 1880 U.S. Census as "Mumtrekhlagamute Station." It had 29 Yup'ik. 1/2 mile away was the adjacent Mumtrekhlagamute Village (1880 population: 41 (all Yup'ik); 1890 population (as Mumtrekhlagamiut) was 33 (28 Yup'ik and 5 Whites). Bethel was established at Mumtrekhlagamute Station in 1885 and supplanted it by the 1890 U.S. Census. It reported 20 residents (13 Yup'ik and 7 Whites). Mumtrekhlagamiut would later be absorbed into Bethel. Bethel did not appear on the 1900 Census, but has on every census since 1910. It would formally incorporate as a city in 1957.

As of the census of 2000, there were 5,471 people, 1,741 households, and 1,190 families residing in the city. There were 1,990 housing units at an average density of 45.5 per square mile (17.6/km). The racial makeup of the city was 26.8% White, 0.9% Black or African American, 61.8% Native American, 2.9% Asian, 0.2% Pacific Islander, 0.5% from other races, and 6.9% from two or more races. Hispanics or Latinos of any race were 1.7% of the population.

There were 1,741 households, out of which 44.1% had children under the age of 18 living with them, 42.6% were married couples living together, 15.2% had a female householder with no husband present, and 33.7% were non-families. 24.5% of all households were made up of individuals, and 3.2% had someone living alone who was 65 years of age or older.  The average household size was 3.00 and the average family size was 3.65.

The age distribution was 35.5% under 18, 9.0% from 18 to 24, 32.7% from 25 to 44, 18.9% from 45 to 64, and 3.9% who were 65 or older.  The median age was 29 years.  For every 100 females, there were 110.4 males.  For every 100 females age 18 and over, there were 109.6 males.

The median income for a household in the city was $57,321, and the median income for a family was $62,431. Males had a median income of $45,321 versus $39,010 for females. The per capita income for the city is $20,267.  About 10.6% of the families and 11.2% of the population were below the poverty line, including 9.7% of those under the age of 18 and 18.3% of those ages 64 and over.

Transportation and economy
The state-owned Bethel Airport is the regional transportation hub, and is served by three passenger carriers, including Alaska Airlines, Grant Aviation, and Renfro's Alaskan Adventure. It also receives service from three major cargo operators: Everts Air Cargo, Northern Air Cargo, Lynden Air Cargo, and numerous small air taxi services. The airport ranks third in the state for total number of flights. It offers a 6,400 foot (1,951-meter) asphalt runway, a 4,000 foot (1,219-meter) asphalt runway, and 1,850 foot (564-meter) gravel crosswind runway, and is currently undergoing a $7 million renovation and expansion. Three float plane bases are nearby: Hangar Lake, H Marker Lake, and the Kuskokwim River.

The Port of Bethel is the northernmost medium-draft port in the United States. River travel is the primary means of local transportation in the summer. A Bethel-based barge service provides goods to Kuskokwim villages.

Winter ice roads lead to several nearby villages, but their condition varies depending on temperature and snowfall. An extensive network of snow machine trails connects Bethel to villages all over the Delta, from the Bering Sea to the Yukon.

The town's single paved road, about 10 miles (16 km), supports a taxicab industry. With 93 taxi drivers, the town has more cab drivers per capita than any other city in the US. Most local cab drivers are Albanian or South Korean immigrants.

Bethel is home to the lone detention center in southwestern Alaska, the Yukon Kuskokwim Correction Center. This prison has a capacity of 207 inmates, men and women, and a staff of 45.

Bethel is also the site of a proposed major Alaskan coal-fired power station and a unique  prototype single-wire earth return electrical intertie to Napakiak, Alaska, constructed in 1981.

Education
Lower Kuskokwim School District operates five schools in Bethel:
 Gladys Jung Elementary School - Bethel
 Jung, previously known as the Kilbuck School, serves grades 3–6.  its enrollment was about 345. 
 Mekelnguut Elitnauriviat School - Bethel
 Nicknamed the "M.E. School," it serves grades Kindergarten through 2.  it has 260 students and 18 teachers.
 Ayaprun Elitnaurvik School - Bethel
It is a K-6 Yup'ik-English bilingual program that originated from a total immersion language program established in 1995.  the school had 197 students. The school occupies space in Mekelnguut Elitnauriviat and Gladys Jung schools;  grades Kindergarten through 1 are in the former and the remainder are in the latter.
 Bethel Regional High School - Bethel
Known locally as "Bethel High School", it serves grades 7–12.  there are approximately 540 students enrolled, and 34 staff members.
 Kuskokwim Learning Academy (alternative)

Other institutions:
 University of Alaska Fairbanks 
 Yuut Elitnaurviat

Sports and recreation
Bethel is home to a noted mid-distance dogsled race, the Kuskokwim 300. Held every January since 1980, the race commemorates an early mail route that once tied the settlement to the outside world. Top mushers and hundreds of sled dogs participate in the race for a purse of $100,000, the largest offered by any  sled dog race.

Local recreational activities include snow machining, skiing, bicycling, kayaking, caribou hunting, and salmon fishing.

Bethel is an established starting point to Float Alaska wilderness rivers in the Kisaralik, Kwethluk, Aniak, Kanektok, Arolik, Goodnews, Eek and Holitna River systems.

Arts and culture
Traditional dancers from all over Alaska and beyond participate every March in the Cama-i dance festival. Hundreds of costumed dancers, drummers, and singers perform traditional Yup'ik story dances during the three-day festival, sponsored by the Bethel Council on the Arts. "Cama-i" (pronounced Cha-Mai) translates as "a warm hello."

The Yupiit Piciryarait Cultural Center also hosts a bimonthly "Saturday Market" where artisans and crafters from the Yukon Kuskokwim Delta come to sell their crafts.  There is a variety at the market, but many of the crafts include traditional Yup'ik qaspeq, story knives, woven baskets, ulu knives and more.

Health care

Bethel and the smaller communities surrounding it are primarily served by Yukon-Kuskokwim Delta Regional Hospital, a 50-bed general acute care medical facility. Services located in the hospital include an adult medical-surgical ward, a pediatric ward, an obstetric ward, as well as outpatient family medicine clinics, an emergency room, pharmacy, lab, X-ray, and specialty clinics. The facility is accessible by road for those individuals living in or visiting the city of Bethel. Depending on weather and the season, road access to the hospital may also be available to some of the surrounding communities. If not, individuals must be airlifted into the facility via helicopter or air ambulance. Also, there are five sub-regional primary care clinics located in some of the more remote and less populated cities neighboring Bethel (Emmonak, St. Mary's, Aniak, Toksook Bay, and Hooper Bay). Many of the services found at the hospital in Bethel are also available at these sub-regional clinics, such as urgent care, diagnostic review, physical exams, prenatal care, minor surgery, laboratory tests, X-rays, and distribution of medications. The hospital, sub-regional clinics, and additional village clinics are all part of Yukon-Kuskokwim Health Corporation.

Media
Bethel has a public television station, KYUK-LD, and three radio stations, public KYUK, private, non-profit KYKD, and commercial KEDI. Since the founding of its community radio station in 1970, the media has become part of Yup'ik development in southwest Alaska and important to the people's self-definition. The city is also home to the weekly regional newspapers Delta Discovery and Tundra Drums.

Sister cities
Bethel has one official sister city.

 Anadyr, Chukotka Autonomous Okrug, Russia

Notable people
 John Binkley (born 1953), businessman, Republican politician
 Valerie Davidson (born 1967), politician
 Nora Guinn (1920–2005), judge
 Lyman Hoffman (born 1950), politician
 Peter Kaiser (born 1987), musher
 Oscar Kawagley (1934–2011), anthropologist, teacher, actor
 Marie Meade (born 1947), dancer
 Jake Metcalfe (born 1958), politician
 Don Page (born 1948), physicist; noted for being a doctoral student of Stephen Hawking
 Mary Sattler Peltola (born 1973), politician
 Tiffany Zulkosky (born 1984), politician

References

External links

 
Cities in Alaska
Cities in Bethel Census Area, Alaska
History of the Alaska Province of the Moravian Church
Cities in Unorganized Borough, Alaska
Road-inaccessible communities of Alaska
Populated places established in 1957
1957 establishments in Alaska